Melbourne Corporation v Commonwealth, also known as the Melbourne Corporation case or the State banking case, is an important case in Australian constitutional law. It stands for the proposition that there are limits on the scope of express Commonwealth legislative powers which can be implied from the federal character of the Constitution.

Principle 
The Melbourne Corporation principle is an implied limit on Commonwealth legislative power under the Constitution of Australia.

The principle renders constitutionally invalid any Commonwealth law that is otherwise valid under a head of power in s51 or some other part of the Constitution if it:

 Places a special burden on the states;
 Significantly impairs, curtails or weakens the capacity of states or state agencies to exercise their constitutional powers or functions.

Significance 
This constitutional protection is one of the few reliable protections in the Australian Constitution against legislative and executive power, the other main protection being the Chapter III Separation of Powers Doctrine.

Recent developments 
The recent case of Austin v Commonwealth conflated the original two-limbed test of the original case into an expanded 1st limb so that a commonwealth law that affects a state's ability to administer itself is constitutionally invalid.

See also
 Re Australian Education Union

External links
  (2003) 31(3) Federal Law Review 507.

References 

1947 in Australian law
1947 in case law
Australian constitutional law
High Court of Australia cases
History of Melbourne
Intergovernmental immunity in the Australian Constitution cases